The Christian-Democratic Movement (KDM) is a socially conservative Christian-democratic political party in Georgia, founded in February 2008 and led by Giorgi Targamadze, formerly an Imedi TV anchor who had once been a Member of the Parliament of Georgia and a close ally of Aslan Abashidze, then a regional leader of Adjara. Former Imedi TV journalists Magda Anikashvili and Giorgi Akhvlediani and former Imedi producer Levan Vepkhvadze, all of whom left the station in January 2008, and one of the leading figures in the party Nika Laliashvili also joined the party.

Among its policies is a commitment to making Orthodox Christianity the state religion of Georgia.

At the May 21, 2008 Georgian legislative election, the party was one of several opposition parties to gain seats in Parliament. However the opposition parties as a whole had such small representation, after elections they considered rigged, that almost all the elected MPs renounced their mandates. The Christian Democrat members however chose to retain their seats, and the party became the main opposition to the ruling United National Movement in Parliament, often referred to as the "Parliamentary Opposition."

The party joined the Alliance of European Conservatives and Reformists in August 2012.

The heavily polarized October 2012 Legislative election resulted in the third place for the party, but a mere 2.05% of the votes was not enough to get any of its candidates to the parliament, and the party lost all its six seats.

In April 2014, after party leader Giorgi Targamadze announced that he was leaving party, majority of party members and leaders joined Nino Burjanadze's Democratic Movement - United Georgia and party practically united with Burjanadze's party, some of party members criticized this decision, party officially still exists under rule of Gocha Jojua.

Electoral performance

References

External links
Christian-Democratic Movement official website 

2008 establishments in Georgia (country)
Alliance of Conservatives and Reformists in Europe member parties
Christian democratic parties in Asia
Christian democratic parties in Europe
Conservative parties in Georgia (country)
Centre-right parties in Georgia (country)
Eastern Orthodox political parties
European Christian Political Movement
International Democrat Union member parties
Political parties established in 2008
Political parties in Georgia (country)
Social conservative parties